Joseph Peter Hanks (born 2 March 1995) is an English footballer who plays as a midfielder for Chippenham Town.

Career
Hanks was still a youth team player when he was promoted to the first team for pre-season training in 2012. He made his professional debut on 27 October 2012, in a 3–0 win over Exeter City in the Football League Two, coming on as a substitute for Sam Deering.

In August 2013, he joined Southern League side Bishop's Cleeve on loan.

On 14 March 2014, Hanks joined Conference North side Gloucester City on a one-month loan deal.

On the first day of the 2014–15 season, he came on as a substitute and scored his first senior goal, and the winner as his club beat Bury.

On 20 September 2014 Hanks came off the bench to score his second professional goal, an 87th-minute equaliser in a 1–1 draw against Dagenham & Redbridge. Over the course of the season, Hanks has established himself as a key part of midfield as Cheltenham Town relegated to the National League.

Hanks made a substitute appearance against Lincoln City on the first day of the 2015–16 season. Then, he was loaned out to the National League North neighbours Gloucester City till January. On 9 December it was announced that his contract will not be renewed at the end of the season.

He has since signed for Gloucester City.

He signed for Chippenham Town in May 2020. On 5 November 2022, Hanks scored the only goal as Chippenham defeated EFL League One side Lincoln City to reach the FA Cup Second Round for the first time in the club's history.

Career statistics

References

External links

1995 births
Living people
English footballers
Association football midfielders
Footballers from Gloucester
People educated at St Peter's High School, Gloucester
Cheltenham Town F.C. players
Bishop's Cleeve F.C. players
Gloucester City A.F.C. players
Chippenham Town F.C. players
English Football League players